You'll own nothing and be happy (alternatively you'll own nothing and you'll be happy) is a phrase used by critics of the World Economic Forum (WEF) who accuse the WEF of desiring restrictions on ownership of private property. It is adapted from an essay for the WEF by Danish politician Ida Auken in 2016.

Background

Auken had previously written in 2014 about a hackathon at the WEF that proposed "FridgeFlix", a startup that would allow users to lease all of their household appliances from a provider that would also service and upgrade these appliances. The proposed company would reduce the risk of residents incurring costly repairs and would work with energy suppliers to reduce power consumption of appliances.

In 2016, Auken published an essay originally titled "Welcome to 2030. I own nothing, have no privacy, and life has never been better", later retitled "Here's how life could change in my city by the year 2030", on the WEF's official web site. It described life in an unnamed city in which the narrator does not own a car, a house, any appliances, and any clothes, and instead relied on shared services for all of their daily needs. Auken later added an author's note to the story responding to critics, stating that it is not her "utopia or dream of the future", and that she intended for the essay to start discussions about technological development.

The WEF published an article and a video in 2016 based in part on Auken's essay. Social media users shared a frame from the video, depicting an unidentified man smiling with a digital on-screen graphic reading "You'll own nothing. And you'll be happy" superimposed, along with criticism of Auken's views. The WEF clarified that it has no stated goal to have individuals "own nothing and be happy", and that its Agenda 2030 framework includes individual ownership and control over private property.

Contemporary reaction

In 2017, a writer for The Independent described Auken's essay as being in line with the principles of the sharing economy, noting that the United Kingdom already had online services to allow users to share property, storage space, cars, designer apparel, tools, and other expensive items. A cofounder of Fat Lama, a rental web site, observed that people who buy expensive items like DSLR cameras and drones opt for more expensive, higher-end models so that they can rent them out to recoup their costs.

Also in 2017, a commentator for European Digital Rights (EDRi) described Auken's article as "chilling" and "dystopian". EDRi criticized Auken's vision of centralized property ownership as a "benevolent dictatorship".

Reaction during COVID pandemic

Although Auken's essay was published more than three years before the COVID-19 pandemic, the phrase gained currency among critics of the WEF after the organization announced the Great Reset initiative for global economic recovery after the pandemic. In 2023, a National Review columnist wrote, referring to the WEF, "Very few of us see owning our own homes, owning our own cars, and owning our own clothes as a major problem to be solved, the sort of crisis that requires Danish legislators and global business elites to gather and come up with a plan to rescue us."

Adrian Monck, the WEF's managing director, traced the phrase's mimetic origin to a post by "an anonymous antisemitic account on the image board 4chan" entitled "Own nothing, be happy — The Jew World Order 2030". The phrase started to spread on extremist forums on the Internet before mainstream news providers like Fox News and Sky News Australia, and popular content creators like Russell Brand, shared it with their audiences. Monck said that the WEF removed all media related to Auken's essay from its web site "because of the online abuse and threats she had faced."

A Reuters fact check noted that false claims about the WEF have been conflated with criticism of the United Nations' Sustainable Development Goals, which include a goal making property ownership available to all by 2030.

References

External links
 "8 predictions for the world in 2030" at the World Economic Forum
 "Welcome To 2030: I Own Nothing, Have No Privacy And Life Has Never Been Better" at Forbes (mirror of Auken's essay)

World Economic Forum
Sharing economy